Orange Walk People's Stadium is a multi-purpose stadium in Orange Walk, Belize.  It is used mostly for football matches and was the home stadium to Juventus in the Belize Premier Football League of the Football Federation of Belize (before moving to Louisiana Football Field) as well as horse racing. Before 2011, it also served as the home stadium to San Felipe Barcelona, also in BPFL.

The stadium holds 4,500 people.

In 2022, the stadium began hosting games for Progresso FC.

References

Football venues in Belize
Belize Premier Football League home stadiums
Multi-purpose stadiums in Belize